Mini Shaji Thomas is the Former Director of National Institute of Technology, Tiruchirappalli (NIT, Trichy) from 2016 - 2021. Thomas was the first female director of the Institute since it was founded in 1964.

Education 
Thomas graduated from the University of Kerala in Electrical Engineering in 1984, where she was a gold medallist in her batch. She completed her M.Tech in Electrical Engineering (Energy Systems) in 1986 from the Indian Institute of Technology, Madras, where she was a gold medallist and won the Siemen Prize. She received her PhD in Electrical Engineering (Power systems) from the Indian Institute of Technology, Delhi in 1991.

Career 
Thomas was the founder Director of the Centre for Innovation and Entrepreneurship at Jamia Millia Islamia and currently Professor in the Department of Electrical Engineering, Faculty of Engineering and Technology. She was the Central Public Information Officer from 2008- 2014 and the Head of the Department of Electrical Engineering from 2005-2008. Thomas was a faculty member at Delhi College of Engineering, Delhi, and at the National Institute of Technology, Calicut before joining Jamia.

At NIT Trichy, Thomas and her team, with the inputs from all stakeholders, developed the Strategic Plan for the Institute, which aims to propel the Institute to be among the top Technical Institutes in the world. Inching towards this goal, the position of the Institute improved to 9th from 12th in ‘Engineering’, and to 24th from 34th in ‘overall’ position, in the NIRF India rankings over the last 3 years.  With her keen interest, able guidance, and leadership, NIT Trichy has set up the first of its kind Centre for Excellence in manufacturing in 2018, at an investment of Rs. 190 Crores, in collaboration with Siemens Industry Software, for Research and Training and Center of Excellence in Artificial Intelligence and Intelligent Machines. The research publications, projects, and consultancy at the Institute have improved substantially with consistent encouragement and recognition of excellence in multiple ways. 

Thomas is currently on the Board of Directors of the US-India Science and Technology Endowment Fund (USISTEF)  and was the President of Shastri-Indo Canadian Institute (SICI) for 2020-21, a binational organization supported by Ministry of Education, Government of India, that promotes understanding between India and Canada through academic activities and exchanges. Dr. Thomas was the Mentor Director of Indian Institute of Information Technology (IIIT) Tiruchirappalli for 3 years ..

Research contributions 

Thomas has done extensive research work in the area of Supervisory Control and Data Acquisition (SCADA) systems, Substation & Distribution Automation, and Smart Grid. She has published over 150 research papers  in International Journals and Conferences of repute, supervised 16 Ph.Ds has successfully completed many research projects, and is the coordinator of the Special Assistance Program (SAP) on Power System Automation from UGC, Government of India. She is also a reviewer of reputed journals in her field.

Thomas has set up the first of its kind SCADA laboratory and Substation Automation (SA) Laboratory at JMI, with Industry involvement, which is bringing laurels to the University in terms of research publications, MOUs, and training opportunities, and more importantly, enhanced image among the world power engineering fraternity. She, as the founder coordinator, drafted the curriculum, started a unique, first full-time, M Tech program in the Faculty of Engineering & Technology, JMI, in 2003 in Electrical Power System Management, with industry participation, which has courses on power automation and novel hands-on training. For these contributions, Thomas won the IEEE Educational Activities Board (EAB) Meritorious Achievement Award 2015 for "Design and Development of curriculum and laboratory facilities for professionals and students in the electric utility industry". She is the author of the textbook 'Power System SCADA and Smart Grids'  by CRC Press, Taylor and Francis, USA, and a book chapter in the McGraw hill  Standard Handbook of Electrical  Engineers, 17th edition, 2018.  She is a 'Distinguished Lecturer' of IEEE Power & Energy Society.

Thomas is very active in professional societies and she is among a handful from the Asia Pacific to be on the global boards of IEEE with experience over a decade on the international boards and committees. Thomas has traveled extensively around the globe, delivered lectures in prestigious universities, and has interacted with technical experts from all over the world.

Awards 
 Best Teacher Award by IEEE Kerala Section in 2019 
 IEEE EAB Meritorious Achievement Award in Continuing Education for "Design and development of curriculum and laboratory facilities for professionals and Students in the Electric Utility Industry" by IEEE Educational Activities Board, USA in 2015 
 Larry K Wilson Trans-National Award by IEEE Member and Geographic Activities Board, USA in 2013 
 Outstanding Power and Energy Chapter Chair by IEEE Power and Energy Society, USA in 2012 
 Outstanding Power Engineer award by IEEE Power and Energy Society Delhi in 2008 
 MGA Innovation Award by IEEE Member and Geographic activities Board, USA in 2008 

In addition, Thomas received the ‘Career Award’ for young teachers, Govt. of India, won the IEEE Power and Energy Society Outstanding Chapter Chair award 2013, IEEE Member and Geographic Activities (MGA) Innovation award 2008, IEEE Outstanding Volunteer award 2005, IEEE Outstanding Branch counselor award 2002 and Power and Energy Society (PES) Outstanding Chapter Engineer award. She is a certified trainer for ‘Capacity building of Women managers in higher education, by UGC and has conducted many training sessions for Women empowerment.

References

External links 
 

Academic staff of Jamia Millia Islamia
People from Kerala
1962 births
Living people
Academic staff of National Institute of Technology, Tiruchirappalli
IIT Madras alumni